Sera (Ssia) is an Austronesian language of coastal Sandaun Province, Papua New Guinea. It is spoken in only one village, namely Sera village of West Aitape Rural LLG, Sandaun Province.

References

Schouten languages
Languages of Sandaun Province